Tyler Gurfein (born November 4, 1989 in Manhattan, New York) is an American dancer performing with the Staatsballett Berlin in Berlin, Germany and previously with  Ballett Zürich in Zürich, Switzerland and Morphoses/The Wheeldon Company. He trained at the School of American Ballet and the Jacqueline Kennedy Onassis School at American Ballet Theatre then joining ABT II in 2007.

Tyler Gurfein has performed in countries such as U.S.A, Canada, Mexico, Costa Rica, Switzerland, Germany, Austria, Spain, Italy, Greece, Denmark, Holland, France, United Kingdom, Turkey, Israel, Andorra and Thailand.

In July 2012, Gurfein danced at the Salzburger Festspiele Salzburg Festival in Salzburg, Austria works by Heinz Spoerli

External links 
Morphoses/The Wheeldon Company website
Ballett Zürich Website

American male ballet dancers
Morphoses dancers
Living people
1989 births